Basza Ajs (born 23 March 1926), known professionally as Berta Loran, is a Polish Brazilian actress.

Early life 
Loran was born Basza Ajs on March 23, 1926 in Warsaw from Jewish parents. In order to flee from Nazism in Europe, Loran, who was only seven years old, and her family immigrated to Brazil in 1937. They lived in a multi-story house in Rio de Janeiro.

In the 40s, Loran was influenced by her father to start her acting career and that was when she decided to use "Berta Loran" as her stage name.

Personal life 
Loran first fiancé was Suchar Handfuss, whom she married in 1951 for "professional interests." They did not have children, but she got pregnant twice from Handfuss. However, she aborted due to financial problems. At the age of 37, Loran married again to Julio Jacoba, a merchant of Polish descent, who was introduced to her by her sister. They divorced in 1988.

Selected filmography
 Amor com Amor Se Paga (1984)
 Você Decide (1995)
 Torre de Babel (1999)
 Cama de Gato (2009)
 Ti Ti Ti (2010)
 Cordel Encantado (2011)
 A Dona do Pedaço (2019)

References

External links

1926 births
Living people
Actresses from Warsaw
Brazilian television actresses
Brazilian telenovela actresses
Polish emigrants to Brazil